John Skoyles may refer to:

 John Skoyles (poet), American poet and writer
 John Skoyles (scientist), neuroscientist and evolutionary psychologist

See also
John Scholes (disambiguation)